Allan George Williams Whitfield  (1909–1987) was an English physician.

Biography
After education at Wellingborough School, A. George Whitfield studied medicine at the University of Birmingham, graduating there MB ChB (Birm.) in 1931. After house appointments at Birmingham General Hospital and at Queen's Hospital, Birmingham he joined a well-established general practice in Sutton Coldfield.
He joined the RAMC Territorial Force in 1933. During WWII he served as second in command of a field ambulance in France and was mentioned in dispatches. He was promoted to lieutenant colonel in 1942 and was appointed assistant director of medical services of the First Army. In 1943 a severe chest infection caused him to be invalided out, and he returned to general practice. He qualified MRCP in 1946. In 1947 he was appointed to Queen Elizabeth Hospital Birmingham as medical registrar at the, then new, professorial department of medicine. There he became in 1948 consultant physician and lecturer in medicine to the University of Birmingham. He graduated MD in 1950 and PhD in 1955. At the University of Birmingham he was from 1955 to 1974 director of the board of graduate medical studies and also professor of medicine from 1966 to 1974. He was editor-in-chief of the Quarterly Journal of Medicine for 13 years.

He was the author or co-author of approximately 200 publications. During the last decade of his life he wrote, with Sir Cyril Clarke, reports on clinical epidemiology in internal medicine.

In 1937 in Sutton Coldfield he married Barbara Franks. They had a daughter.

Awards and honours
 1953 — elected FRCP
 1970 — President of the West Midlands Physicians Association
 1974 — appointed CBE
 1975 — Lumleian Lecturer on Ankylosing spondylitis
 1978 — Fellow of the Faculty of Community Medicine
 1983 — Croonian Sermonizer
 1986 — Harveian Orator on Royal physicians

See also
Sir James Clark, 1st Baronet (subject of the biography Beloved Sir James: the life of Sir James Clark, Bart., Physician to Queen Victoria, 1788–1870, 280 pages by George Whitfield)

Selected publications

 1963

 1972

References

1909 births
1987 deaths
20th-century English medical doctors
People educated at Wellingborough School
Alumni of the University of Birmingham
Fellows of the Royal College of Physicians
Royal Army Medical Corps officers
Commanders of the Order of the British Empire